Vladimir Viktorovich Vasiliev (born 18 April 1940) is a Soviet and Russian ballet dancer and choreographer. He was a principal dancer with the Bolshoi Ballet and its director from 1995 to 2000. He was best known for his role of Spartacus and his powerful leaps and turns. He received the People's Artist of the USSR (1973).

Vasiliev was named "God of the dance" and is regarded as a classical dancer on the same level as Rudolf Nureyev, Erik Bruhn and Mikhail Baryshnikov. At the height of their careers, Vasiliev and Ekaterina Maximova were the golden couple of Russian ballet.

Early life
Vasiliev was born in Moscow in 1940, the son of a mechanical engineer. In 1947, at the age of seven, he joined the amateur ballet group of the Kirov pioneer group, where he stayed two years. His first teacher was Elena Romanovna Rosse.

He entered the Moscow Ballet School, commonly known as The Bolshoi Ballet Academy, in 1947 and graduated in 1958, when he joined the Bolshoi Ballet. His teachers at the Moscow Ballet School included Aleksey Yermolayev.

Career

Principal Dancer with the Bolshoi Ballet
Vasiliev became a principal dancer in 1959 in his second year with the Bolshoi Ballet.

Career with Ekaterina Maximova 

Vasiliev and Ekaterina Maximova, both principal dancers, were the dream couple of the Bolshoi Ballet. Dancing as a pair for the first time in 1949 as classmates at the Moscow Ballet School, they were married in 1961.

New York Times dance critic Anna Kisselgoff described the excitement of one of Vasiliev's United States performances with the Bolshoi Ballet: "Yekaterina Maksimova and Vladimir Vasiliev burst upon New York City in 1959, the greatest of the passionate young dancers who, with Moscow's more established stars, made the Bolshoi Ballet's American debut a total triumph."

The Bolshoi tour to London in 1969 was dominated by the sensational impact of Aram Khachaturian's ballet Spartacus as choreographed by Yury Grigorovich, in which, wrote the leading critic Richard Buckle, "Maximova would melt any tyrant's heart".

The great male dancer Mikhail Baryshnikov recently paid tribute to the couple, saying Maximova, with her "elegant build, beauty, virtuosity and even more so her spontaneity and sincerity", was treated like a "rare treasure" by the indomitable Vasiliev. This gave their performances an almost sacred aura, to which audiences gratefully responded.

Vasiliev and Ekaterina Maximova gleaned wide exposure for their appearances in Franco Zeffirelli's filmed version of Giuseppe Verdi's opera La traviata of 1983. Both performed in Spanish costume, Vasiliev as a matador, in the "divertissements" composed for the equivalent of Act II, scene 2.

The couple was filmed in 1988 by French director Dominique Delouche in a film portrait “Katia et Volodia".

In 2008, the Bolshoi hosted a week-long festival dedicated to Maximova and Vasiliev's 50 years on the Bolshoi stage, during which Vasiliev commented that the secret of partnering was "the man must not get in the way of the woman – she is the most important person on stage." He added that all his life his wife had been his inspiration for two qualities: her beauty and her capacity for hard work.

The marriage lasted for 50 years, until Maximova died in 2009. They had no children.

Director of the Bolshoi ballet
In March 1995, Vasiliev was appointed the General and Artistic Director of the Bolshoi Theatre after Yury Grigorovich, artistic director of the ballet company since 1963, was dismissed by Russian President Boris Yeltsin.

Among the major projects Vasiliev has spearheaded there were such as the large scale exchange of Bolshoi and Mariinsky Ballet companies in 1998, of the Bolshoi and Paris Opera Ballet to be held, first-ever New Year Ball in the Bolshoi on 31 December 1999, foundation of the International Club of the Bolshoi Friends.

At the end of the 1990s, he was one of the first ballet directors who recognized the class and the outstanding qualities of Svetlana Zakharova, then principal dancer with the Mariinsky ballet. Svetlana Zakharova became a principal dancer with the Bolshoi Ballet in October 2003.

Vasiliev was dismissed as director of the Bolshoi Theater on 28 August 2000. He learned about his dismissal from hearing it on the radio.

Choreographer
Since his exit from the Bolshoi, Vasiliev premiered in the ballet production Lungo Viaggio Nella Notte di Natale, set to Tchaikovsky's music, in Opera di Roma, and continues to choreograph and stage new ballets.

Legacy
Vasiliev is not as well known in the west as other iconic male dancers such as Rudolf Nureyev and Mikhail Baryshnikov, because he remained in the Soviet Union and did most of his work there.
Nevertheless, his work as a classical dancer is regarded on the same level as both Nureyev and Baryshnikov. Mathias Heymann, who was promoted to principal dancer with the Paris Opera Ballet in 2009 at only 22 years old, told in an interview that he takes inspiration from watching videos of Rudolf Nureyev, whom he regards as his role model, along with Vasiliev and Baryshnikov.

Russia's influential ballet critic and choreographer Fyodor Lopukhov called Vasiliev "God of the dance" and "A miracle in art, perfection".

Performance style

On stage
Numerous roles were created for Vasiliev, and he performed throughout the world, usually partnering his wife. Among the most notable were those created by Yury Grigorovich, who gave him the principal roles in his original productions of The Tale of the Stone Flower, Spartacus, The Nutcracker, the ballet version of Ivan the Terrible, Valery Gavrilin's Anyuta (1982), and Yakov Eshpai's Angara (1976). Besides Maximova, Vasiliev's famous partners included Galina Ulanova, Maya Plisetskaya, Alicia Alonso, Carla Fracci, Rita Poelvoorde and Ambra Vallo.

Style
Having a body revealing great physical strength, Vasiliev did not embody the ideal physical form for a classical dancer.

He made enormous contributions to the development of classical male dance, embodying the strong new Bolshoi male.

"You see — at the beginning we do things only as we have seen them done," said Vasiliev at the end of Katia et Volodia, the 1988 film exploring Vasiliev's artistry and that of his wife and fellow Bolshoi luminary, Ekaterina Maximova. "Afterwards, we do them with what we find inside ourselves."

Honours and awards

Vasiliev is the first dancer to be given the award "La médaille d'or du meilleur danseur du monde" ("The Gold Medal of the World's Best Dancer") and also the only Grand Prix award winner at the Varna International Ballet Competition since winning the first competition in 1964.

Over the years, Vasiliev has received many of the most prestigious Soviet, Russian and foreign prizes, orders and highest awards including the USSR State Prize, Russian State Prize, Order "For Merit to the Fatherland" and State Order “For Merits” of France, Lithuanian State Order, Order of Rio Branco (Brazil), UNESCO Pablo Picasso Medal and others.

Awards
 1959 : Gold Medal, Festival of Youth, Vienna
 1964 : Grand Prix of Varna at the Varna International Ballet Competition 
1993 : Crystal Turandot Award for theatre arts, along with Ekaterina Maximova

Filmography
 Katia et Volodia: : A Portrait in Dance with Ekaterina Maximova and Vladimir Vasiliev, film by Dominique Delouche, 58 min, 1988

See also
 List of Russian ballet dancers

References

External links

 Official website of Vladimir Vasiliev
 Vladimir Vasiliev in Spartacus 1972 (6 min 22)
 Vladimir Vasiliev - God of the dance, film, Vladimir Vasiliev's 12 best performances (42 min 12)
 Vladimir Vasiliev, profile

1940 births
20th-century Russian ballet dancers
20th-century Russian male actors
20th-century Russian poets
Living people
Dancers from Moscow
Male actors from Moscow
Choreographers of Bolshoi Theatre
Knights of the Ordre national du Mérite
Honored Artists of the RSFSR
People's Artists of the RSFSR
People's Artists of the USSR
Lenin Prize winners
Glinka State Prize of the RSFSR winners
Recipients of the Lenin Komsomol Prize
Recipients of the Order "For Merit to the Fatherland", 3rd class
Recipients of the Order "For Merit to the Fatherland", 4th class
Recipients of the Order of Friendship of Peoples
Recipients of the Order of Lenin
Recipients of the Order of the Red Banner of Labour
Recipients of the Order of the Rising Sun, 3rd class
Recipients of the USSR State Prize
Recipients of the Vasilyev Brothers State Prize of the RSFSR
Russian choreographers
Russian male ballet dancers
Russian male film actors
Russian male painters
Russian male poets
Russian male stage actors
Russian theatre directors
Soviet choreographers
Soviet male ballet dancers
Soviet male film actors
Soviet male poets
Soviet male stage actors
Soviet painters